Charles J. Fuschillo Jr. (born July 1, 1960) is a former Republican member of the New York State Senate from Long Island.  From 1998 to 2013, he represented the 8th State Senate district, which spans several South Shore communities in both Nassau and Suffolk Counties.  The district currently includes the communities of Wantagh, Merrick, Bellmore,  Massapequa Park, Freeport, Roosevelt, Seaford, Amityville, and Copiague, as well as parts of Massapequa, Farmingdale, Baldwin, Lindenhurst, West Babylon, Wheatley Heights, and Wyandanch.  Senator Fuschillo resigned from the New York State Senate on December 31, 2013 to serve as the President and CEO of the Alzheimer's Foundation of America.

Biography 
Fuschillo was born in Westbury, New York, and graduated from Carle Place High School. He then attended Nassau Community College. In 1982, he earned a Bachelor of Business Administration degree from Adelphi University, majoring in Finance.

Prior to being elected to the New York State Senate, Fuschillo served as the Chief Operating Officer of a private, not-for-profit family service agency where he managed over four hundred employees and forty human service programs throughout Long Island and the five boroughs of New York City.
Fuschillo currently serves as the President & CEO of the Alzheimer's Foundation of America (AFA).

Political activities
Fuschillo has been a campaigner against drunk driving in New York State. He sponsored "Leandra's Law," which makes it a felony to drive drunk with a child in the car and requires all convicted drunk drivers to use ignition interlocks to prevent them from drinking and driving again. He sponsored laws which lowered New York State's legal blood alcohol content (BAC) level from .10 to .08; enacted tougher penalties for repeat offenders and those who drive with an elevated BAC; and expanded the use of ignition interlock devices to keep convicted DWI offenders from drinking and driving again. He also wrote the law creating new felony crimes for drunk drivers who kill or severely injure others.

Fuschillo helped create the Broad Hollow Bioscience Park at Farmingdale State College, which serves as a home to established and startup biotechnology companies and provides high-tech jobs for Long Islanders. In April 2011, he authored a law to expand Broad Hollow Bioscience Park to create new jobs and promote economic development. He has sponsored programs to help small business owners learn about different resources available to help them grow and create jobs and sponsored job resource expos.

Fuschillo sponsored complete streets legislation which would require all state, county, and local transportation agencies in New York State to consider complete streets design principles on all projects which receive both federal and state funding.  Complete streets design principles are roadway design features that accommodate and facilitate safe travel by pedestrians, bicyclists, and motorists of all ages and abilities. The legislation was approved by the New York State Legislature in June 2011 and signed into law two months later. The New York League of Conservation Voters named him a 2011 Eco-Star for his efforts in getting the law passed.

Fuschillo sponsored a law to safeguard individuals' personal and private information.

To help further protect consumers, Fuschillo authored New York State's Telemarketer "Do Not Call" Registry law, which served as the model for the federal government’s “Do Not Call” registry. He also sponsored the law which raised the maximum fine for price gouging to $25,000 per violation.

Fuschillo strengthened New York State’s Clean Indoor Air Act to make worksites and public places smoke-free.

Fuschillo also sponsored a statewide ban on over-the-counter products containing the dangerous dietary supplement ephedra. Fuschillo has authored child safety laws, and helped secure new educational technology for local school districts. Additionally, he sponsored a statewide ban on dangerous drop-side cribs, which have been linked to numerous child deaths and injuries.

Fuschillo sponsored breast, prostate and skin cancer screening programs in communities throughout his Senate District. Partnering with breast cancer advocacy organizations, he wrote the law that requires New York State to match donations made to the state's Breast Cancer Research and Education Fund listed on state income tax return forms. He also fought to end the practice of disqualifying adoptive parents on the basis of being a survivor of cancer or any other serious illness.

He authored a law, signed on November 1, 2011, to prevent insurance companies from denying treatments and therapies for autism. Autism Speaks, a national autism advocacy organization, named Fuschillo a "legislative champion" in 2012 for authoring the law.

Personal background
Fuschillo and his wife, Ellen, reside in Merrick with their 3 children, Daniel, Chad, and Catie.

Community involvement
Fuschillo is involved with local organizations, including Kiwanis, the Chamber of Commerce, the Community Wellness Council, Italian Americans in Government, and Order Sons of Italy in America. He  served as a coach for the Police Athletic League.

See also
 2009 New York State Senate leadership crisis

References

External links

1960 births
Living people
Republican Party New York (state) state senators
People from Westbury, New York
People from Merrick, New York
21st-century American politicians
Nassau Community College alumni
Carle Place High School alumni